Sebastian Baczkiewicz (born 1962, Hammersmith, London) is an English writer.

Biography

As a teenager, Baczkiewicz was a member of Questors Theatre in West London before training as an actor at The Drama Centre. He was the BBC's first writer in residence in 2000.

Work

Author of a number of episodes of Holby City, Baczkiewicz has written a range of plays for BBC Radio including adaptations of Les Miserables and The Count of Monte Cristo and nine series of Pilgrim, starring Paul Hilton as William Palmer, the immortal title character.

His stage plays include The Lives of the Saints, Hello Paris, The Man Who Shot the Tiger and Dancing under the Bridge.

In 2004, he wrote half of a six-part series, Arthur, for BBC Radio 4 using characters from Arthurian legend.

In 2012, his radio drama Pilgrim was nominated for the Prix Italia and awarded silver at the Prix Europa.

Baczkiewicz was lead writer on Radio 4's Home Front, a radio drama series broadcast across the centenary of the First World War, in 14 series, from 2014 to 2018, and in which William Palmer makes a brief one-word appearance.

Ghosts of Heathrow, with Paul McGann was broadcast in 2014. Recorded on location, An Angel in Miami and Elsinor were broadcast on Radio 4 in 2019.

References

External links
Radio Listings (Pilgrim)

Living people
English television writers
English fantasy writers
1962 births